Richard Mpong (born 4 July 1990 in Tarkwa) is a Ghanaian professional footballer who currently plays as a winger, for Elmina Sharks and the Ghana national football team.

Club career

All Blacks FC
Mpong signed with Ghanaian club All Blacks FC in the 2006–2007 season. Mpong played for All Blacks until 2008.

Medeama SC
On 1 July 2008, Mpong joined Kessben FC. In January 2011, the club changed their name and were renamed Medeama SC.

Asante Kotoko
In July 2012, Mpong signed contract with Asante Kotoko.

International career

Ghana national under-17 team
2007 U-17 World Cup
Mpong represented the Ghana national under-17 football team at the 2007 FIFA U-17 World Cup in Korea Republic.

Ghana national under-23 team
2011 All-Africa Games
Mpong was a member of the Ghana national under-23 football team that won Ghana's first All-Africa Games football gold medal in the Football at the 2011 All-Africa Games when they defeated South Africa national under-23 football team 4–2 on penalty shoot-out at the Estádio do Zimpeto in Maputo, Mozambique on 17 September 2011.

Ghana national team
Mpong received an International friendly match call-up by the Ghana national football team technical staff for the Ghana national football team vs. Chile national football team friendly match at the PPL Park in Chester, Pennsylvania, United States on 29 February 2012. Mpong came on in the 18th Minute as a substitute and scored against Chile after receiving a pass from Sulley Muntari.

In November 2013, coach Maxwell Konadu invited Mpong to be a part of the Ghana national football team for the 2013 WAFU Nations Cup. Mpong helped the Ghana national football team to a first-place finish after Ghana beat Senegal national football team by three goals to one. Mpong was included in the Ghana national football team that finished runner-up at the 2014 African Nations Championship.

Senior International goals

Honours

Club 
Asante Kotoko
 Ghana Premier League Winner: 2012–13, 2013–14
 Ghanaian FA Cup: Runner-up 2012–13, Winner 2013–14
 Ghana Super Cup Winner: 2012–13

National Team 

 WAFU Nations Cup Winner: 2013
 African Nations Championship Runner-up: 2014
Ghana U23
All-Africa Games Gold medal: 2011

References

External links

1990 births
Living people
Association football wingers
Association football forwards
Ghanaian footballers
Ghana international footballers
All Blacks F.C. players
Medeama SC players
Asante Kotoko S.C. players
Ghana Premier League players
WAFU Nations Cup players
Ghana A' international footballers
2014 African Nations Championship players
African Games gold medalists for Ghana
African Games medalists in football
Aduana Stars F.C. players
Competitors at the 2011 All-Africa Games
Elmina Sharks F.C. players